North Western Road Car Company was a bus operator based in Liverpool, England. The company operated between 1986 and 1998.

History
In the lead up to the privatisation of the National Bus Company, in 1986 the government stipulated that the larger business units be split to boost competition. Thus Ribble Motor Services whose operations stretched across North West England from Cumbria to the East Lancashire/West Yorkshire borders and Greater Manchester to West Lancashire/North Merseyside was one such company, and in the summer of 1986 its Merseyside - Aintree and Bootle, West Lancashire - Skelmersdale and Greater Manchester - Wigan depots were transferred to a new company, North Western Road Car Company.

The North Western Road Car Company name had previously been used by a National Bus Company subsidiary based in Stockport with operations in Cheshire, Derbyshire, South-East Lancashire and what became Greater Manchester until it was split up with parts being absorbed by Crosville Motor Services, Ribble Motor Services,  Trent Motor Traction and the SELNEC PTE in 1974.

The new North Western was based in Bootle, later moving to Aintree with a new livery of red and blue separated by a grey diamond stripe replacing NBC's poppy red.

In January 2022 the name was registered by a company not involved in the bus industry.

Drawlane ownership
On 16 March 1988, North Western was to sold to the Drawlane Group, which in 1992 was restructured as British Bus.

Crosville acquisition
Crosville Motor Services like Ribble had seen its English and Welsh operations - now Crosville Cymru, split and after abandoning Liverpool (see above) what remained of Crosville in Cheshire and in particular the Wirral was unprofitable due to increased competition not only from Merseybus but also from Staffordshire based Potteries Motor Traction (PMT) which was in a phase of expansion and began a new operation on the Wirral branded as Red Rider as well as new entrants like Busman Buses, CMT Buses, Gold Star and Wirral Bus. Crosville was sold by NBC in 1988 to American banking consortium ATL but ATL's acquisition of Crosville was thought to be a short term move for them to sell the company on for a profit and indeed ATL did sell Crosville on to Drawlane in the autumn of 1989.

Initially Drawlane claimed it wanted to develop Crosville and by the end of 1989. a brighter 1980s style green/cream livery and Crosville logos was introduced. However these operations bordered not only North Western's but those of Midland Red North which was also owned by Drawlane and in 1989, Drawlane absorbed the Crosville operations at Runcorn, Warrington and Winsford into North Western with those at Crewe and Macclesfield becoming part of Midland Red North. Additionally the Crosville depots at Rock Ferry, Chester and Ellesmere Port were sold by Drawlane to PMT who maintained Crosville fleetnames albeit with PMT's red/yellow livery.

Bee Line, Amberline and Liverline
In September 1989, Drawlane purchased Greater Manchester-based Bee Line Buzz Company from Stagecoach. Bee Line used high frequency minibuses and was a major competitor for former PTE operator GM Buses. After the Drawlane takeover Bee Line became a subsidiary of North Western who retained Bee Line branding but began to refocus the service network more towards the south of Greater Manchester with conventional sized vehicles replacing most of the minibuses. In the spring of 1993, British Bus, acquired Crosville Cymru from National Express, who in 1989 had purchased Amberline, a Liverpool-based operator.

Cowie Group and consolidation
In August 1996, North Western's parent British Bus, was acquired by the Cowie Group.

Mid-90s re-branding and Arriva

In November 1997, the Cowie Group was renamed Arriva, with North Western rebranded in 1998. North Western Road Car Company became Arriva North West, the Bee Line operation becoming Arriva Manchester and Liverline became Arriva Merseyside.

References

External links
Flickr gallery

Defunct companies based in Liverpool
Historic transport in Merseyside
1986 establishments in England
1998 disestablishments in England
Former bus operators in Merseyside
British companies disestablished in 1998
British companies established in 1986